The 1975 Ohio Bobcats football team was an American football team that represented Ohio University in the Mid-American Conference (MAC) during the 1975 NCAA Division I football season. In their 18th season under head coach Bill Hess, the Bobcats compiled a 5–5–1 record (3–3–1 against MAC opponents), finished in fifth place in the MAC, and outscored all opponents by a combined total of 164 to 143.  They played their home games in Peden Stadium in Athens, Ohio.

Schedule

References

Ohio
Ohio Bobcats football seasons
Ohio Bobcats football